Dietrich Haugk (12 May 1925 – 28 June 2015) was a German film director and voice actor. He was born in Ellrich/Harz, Germany.
He made his stage debut at a theater in Bielefeld in 1946 and has been a noted theater director since 1949 and served as the German dubbing voice of Vittorio Gassman, Dirk Bogarde, Montgomery Clift and Jean-Louis Trintignant.

Married four times to actresses, he has three children, a son from his first and a son and a daughter from his fourth marriage. He died in Berlin. He was married four times and had three children.

Selected filmography 
  (1960) — (based on Minna von Barnhelm)
 Agatha, Stop That Murdering! (1960)
 Don't Tell Me Any Stories (1964)
 Adrian der Tulpendieb (1966, TV miniseries) — (based on a novel by Otto Rombach)
 Der Trinker (1967, TV film) — (based on The Drinker by Hans Fallada)
 Der Monat der fallenden Blätter (1968, TV film) — (based on The Month of the Falling Leaves by Bruce Marshall)
 Der Kommissar (1969–1976, TV series, 8 episodes)
 Wienerinnen (1974, TV film) — (based on a play by Hermann Bahr)
 Derrick (1974–1998, TV series, 14 episodes)
 Das Konzert (1975, TV film) — (based on the play The Concert by Hermann Bahr)
 The Old Fox (1977–1998, TV series, 19 episodes)
 Tatort: Der King (1979, TV series episode)
 Sonderdezernat K1 (1982, TV series, 2 episodes)
 Die goldenen Schuhe (1983, TV miniseries) — (based on a play by Vicki Baum)
 Die Fräulein von damals (1986, TV film) — (screenplay by Robert Muller)
 Tatort: Tod auf Eis (1986, TV series episode)
 Praxis Bülowbogen (1987–1991, TV series, 16 episodes)
 Die Männer vom K3 (1988–1996, TV series, 5 episodes)
 Radiofieber (1989, TV miniseries) — (screenplay by Peter Märthesheimer and Pea Fröhlich)
 Rothenbaumchaussee (1991, TV film) — (screenplay by Robert Muller)
 Die Elefantenbraut (1993, TV film) — (screenplay by Manfred Purzer)
 Großstadtrevier (1995–1997, TV series, 10 episodes)
 Lebenslügen (2000, TV film)

References

 Dietrich Haugk on the Google Books Library Project

External links
 

1925 births
2015 deaths
People from Nordhausen (district)
Mass media people from Thuringia
German male voice actors
People from the Harz